The City of York is a unitary authority area with city status in the ceremonial county of North Yorkshire, England. The district's main settlement is York, and it extends to the surrounding area including the town of Haxby and the villages of Earswick, Upper Poppleton, Nether Poppleton, Copmanthorpe, Bishopthorpe, Dunnington, Stockton on the Forest, Rufforth, Askham Bryan and Askham Richard, among other villages and hamlets. The unitary area had a population of 202,800 in the 2021 Census The City of York is administered by the City of York Council based in The Guildhall.

Governance 
York's first citizen and civic head is the Lord Mayor, who is the chairman of the City of York Council. The appointment is made by the city council each year in May, at the same time as appointing the Sheriff, the city's other civic head. The offices of Lord Mayor and Sheriff are purely ceremonial. The Lord Mayor carries out civic and ceremonial duties in addition to chairing full council meetings. The incumbent Lord Mayor since 26 May 2022 is Councillor David Carr, and the Sheriff is Suzie Mercer.

As a result of the 2019 City of York Council election, the Conservative Party was reduced to two seats. The Liberal Democrats had 21 councillors, while the Labour Party had 17 councillors and the Green Party had four with three Independents. Due to no overall control, the Liberal Democrats and the Green Party agreed to form a coalition on 14 May 2019.

Civil parishes 
The district contains the unparished area of York and 31 civil parishes:
 Acaster Malbis
 Askham Bryan
 Askham Richard
 Bishopthorpe
 Clifton Without
 Copmanthorpe
 Deighton
 Dunnington
 Earswick
 Elvington
 Fulford
 Haxby
 Heslington
 Hessay
 Heworth Without
 Holtby
 Huntington
 Kexby
 Murton
 Naburn
 Nether Poppleton
 New Earswick
 Osbaldwick
 Rawcliffe
 Rufforth with Knapton
 Skelton
 Stockton-on-the-Forest
 Strensall with Towthorpe
 Upper Poppleton
 Wheldrake
 Wigginton

Wards 
York is divided into 21 electoral wards: Acomb, Bishopthorpe, Clifton, Copmanthorpe, Dringhouses and Woodthorpe, Fishergate, Fulford and Heslington, Guildhall, Haxby and Wigginton, Heworth, Heworth Without, Holgate, Hull Road, Huntington and New Earswick, Micklegate, Osbaldwick and Derwent, Rawcliffe and Clifton Without, Rural West York, Strensall, Westfield, and Wheldrake.

History 
The district was formed on 1 April 1996 from the previous non-metropolitan district of York and the parishes of Hessay, Nether Poppleton, Rufforth and Upper Poppleton from Harrogate district, the parishes of Clifton Without, Earswick, Haxby, Heworth Without, Holtby, Huntington, Murton, New Earswick, Osbaldwick, Rawcliffe, Skelton, Stockton-on-the-Forest, Strensall, Towthorpe and Wigginton from Ryedale district, and the parishes of Acaster Malbis, Askham Bryan, Askham Richard, Bishopthorpe, Copmanthorpe, Deighton, Dunnington, Elvington, Fulford, Heslington, Kexby, Naburn and Wheldrake from Selby district. The previous district was in the non-metropolitan county (administrative county) of North Yorkshire and the new district became a separate non-metropolitan county, while remaining part of the ceremonial county of North Yorkshire. The previous district itself had been reconstituted in 1974 from the county borough with the same boundaries.

Ceremonial
York is within the ceremonial county of North Yorkshire and, until 1974, was within the jurisdiction of the Lord Lieutenant of the County of York, West Riding and the County of The City of York. The city retains the right to appoint its own Sheriff. The holder of the Royal dukedom of York has no responsibilities, either ceremonially or administratively, as regards to the city.

References

External links 
 

 
Local government districts of North Yorkshire
Unitary authority districts of England
Local government districts of Yorkshire and the Humber
Boroughs in England